OCN (originally an initialism of the Orion Cinema Network) is a movie channel on basic cable throughout South Korea, owned by CJ ENM E&M Division. In the 2000s, it became the most viewed station in South Korea, which prompted them to create their widely recognized English-language slogan, "Korea number-one channel." With cable TV penetration quite high in South Korea, OCN is a popular movie resource.

OCN's lineup is a mixture of movies from several years ago or earlier, particularly during the daytime, with more recent films during evening prime-time hours. They do not air movies that are as recent as those of sister station CatchOn, a pay service offered on cable TV. They also air episodes of popular overseas television series, mostly from the United States.

Programs

Viewership ratings
 The table below lists the top 15 series with the highest average audience share ratings (nationwide), corresponding episode with highest rating and the date.

 The table below lists the top 10 series with the highest nationwide viewers (million), corresponding episode with highest nationwide viewers and the date.

Footnotes

References

External links
 

CJ E&M channels
On-Media television networks
Daewoo Cinema Network
Movie channels in South Korea
Television channels in South Korea
Television channels and stations established in 1995